The 1900 LSU Tigers football team represented the LSU Tigers of Louisiana State University during the 1900 Southern Intercollegiate Athletic Association football season. After a year with coach John P. Gregg, the Tigers rehired Edmond Chavanne for the head coaching position at LSU football.  The 1900 season featured two games against Millsaps, one at Tulane, and one against Louisiana State University alumni.

Schedule

Roster

Roster from Fanbase.com and LSU: The Louisiana Tigers

References

LSU
LSU Tigers football seasons
LSU Tigers football